Máximo González and Andrés Molteni defeated Nathaniel Lammons and Jackson Withrow in the final, 6–7(6–8), 7–6(7–4), [10–5] to win the doubles tennis title at the 2022 Gijón Open. 

This was the first edition of the tournament.

Seeds

Draw

Draw

References

External links
 Main draw

2022 ATP Tour
Gijón Open